USS San Bernardino or San Bernardino County may refer to the following ships of the United States Navy:

 
 
 

United States Navy ship names